The Asian Basketball Club Championship 1984 was the 2nd staging of the Asian Basketball Club Championship, the basketball club tournament of Asian Basketball Confederation. The tournament was held in Ipoh, Malaysia, November 22 to December 3, 1984.

Preliminary round

Group A

Group B

Group C

Second round
 The results and the points of the matches between the same teams that were already played during the preliminary round shall be taken into account for the second round.

Classification 7th–12th

Championship

Final round

3rd place

Final

Final standing

References
Fibaasia.net

1984
Champions Cup
B
Basketball Asia Champions Cup 1984